Anne of Green Gables is a 1908 novel by Canadian author Lucy Maud Montgomery (published as L. M. Montgomery). Written for all ages, it has been considered a classic children's novel since the mid-20th century. Set in the late 19th century, the novel recounts the adventures of 11 year old orphan girl Anne Shirley sent by mistake to two middle-aged siblings, Matthew and Marilla Cuthbert, who had originally intended to adopt a boy to help them on their farm in the fictional town of Avonlea in Prince Edward Island, Canada. The novel recounts how Anne makes her way through life with the Cuthberts, in school, and within the town.

Since its publication, Anne of Green Gables has been translated into at least 36 languages and has sold more than 50 million copies, making it one of the best-selling books worldwide. It was the first of many novels; Montgomery wrote numerous sequels, and since her death another sequel has been published, as well as an authorized prequel titled Before Green Gables. This prequel was written in 2008 by Budge Wilson to celebrate the 100th anniversary of the book series. The original book is taught to students around the world.

The book has been adapted as films, television films, and animated and live-action television series. Musicals and plays have also been created, with productions annually in Europe and Japan.

Background 

In writing the novel, Montgomery was inspired by notes she had made as a young girl about two siblings  who were mistakenly sent an orphan girl instead of the boy they had requested, yet decided to keep her. She drew upon her own childhood experiences in rural Prince Edward Island, Canada. Montgomery used a photograph of Evelyn Nesbit, which she had clipped from New York's Metropolitan Magazine and put on the wall of her bedroom, as the model for the face of Anne Shirley and a reminder of her "youthful idealism and spirituality."

Montgomery was inspired by the "formula Ann" orphan stories (called such because they followed such a predictable formula) that were popular at the time, but distinguished her character by spelling her name with an extra "e". She based other characters, such as Gilbert Blythe, in part on people she knew. She said she wrote the novel in the twilight of the day, while sitting at her window and overlooking the fields of Cavendish.

Plot summary 
Anne Shirley, a young orphan from the fictional community of Bolingbroke, Nova Scotia (based upon the real community of New London, Prince Edward Island), is sent to live with Marilla and Matthew Cuthbert, unmarried siblings in their fifties and sixties, after a childhood spent in strangers' homes and orphanages. Marilla and Matthew had originally decided to adopt a boy from the orphanage to help Matthew run their farm at Green Gables, which is set in the fictional town of Avonlea (based on Cavendish, Prince Edward Island). Through a misunderstanding, the orphanage sends Anne instead.

Anne is fanciful, imaginative, eager to please, and dramatic. She is also adamant her name should always be spelt with an e at the end. However, she is defensive about her appearance, despising her red hair, freckles and pale, thin frame, but liking her nose. She is talkative, especially when it comes to describing her fantasies and dreams. At first, stern Marilla says Anne must return to the orphanage, but after much observation and consideration, along with kind, quiet Matthew's encouragement, Marilla decides to let her stay.

Anne takes much joy in life and adapts quickly, thriving in the close-knit farming village. Her imagination and talkativeness soon brighten up Green Gables.

The book recounts Anne's struggles and joys in settling in to Green Gables (the first real home she's ever known): the country school where she quickly excels in her studies; her friendship with Diana Barry, the girl living next door (her best or "bosom friend" as Anne fondly calls her); her budding literary ambitions; and her rivalry with her classmate Gilbert Blythe, who teases her about her red hair. For that, he earns her instant hatred, although he apologizes several times. As time passes, however, Anne realizes she no longer hates Gilbert, but her pride and stubbornness keep her from speaking to him.

The book also follows Anne's adventures in Avonlea. Episodes include play-time with her friends Diana, calm, placid Jane Andrews, and beautiful, boy-crazy Ruby Gillis. She has run-ins with the unpleasant Pye sisters, Gertie and Josie, and frequent domestic "scrapes" such as dyeing her hair green while intending to dye it black, and accidentally getting Diana drunk by giving her what she thinks is raspberry cordial but which turns out to be currant wine.

At sixteen, Anne goes to Queen's Academy to earn a teaching license, along with Gilbert, Ruby, Josie, Jane, and several other students, excluding Diana, much to Anne's dismay. She obtains her license in one year instead of the usual two and wins the Avery Scholarship awarded to the top student in English. This scholarship would allow her to pursue a Bachelor of Arts (B.A.) degree at the fictional Redmond College (based on the real Dalhousie University) on the mainland in Nova Scotia.

Near the end of the book, however, tragedy strikes when Matthew dies of a heart attack after learning that all of his and Marilla's money has been lost in a bank failure. Out of devotion to Marilla and Green Gables, Anne gives up the scholarship to stay at home and help Marilla, whose eyesight is failing. She plans to teach at the Carmody school, the nearest school available, and return to Green Gables on weekends. In an act of friendship, Gilbert Blythe gives up his teaching position at the Avonlea School to work at the White Sands School instead, knowing that Anne wants to stay close to Marilla after Matthew's death. After this kind act, Anne and Gilbert's friendship is cemented, and Anne looks forward to what life will bring next.

Characters

The Green Gables household 
 Anne Shirley: An imaginative, talkative, red-haired orphan who comes to live with Matthew and Marilla Cuthbert at age 11. Anne is very sensitive and dislikes the colour of her hair. Anne's bleak early childhood was spent being shuttled from orphanage to foster homes, caring for younger children. She is excited to finally have a real home at Green Gables.
 Marilla Cuthbert: Matthew's sister, an austere but fair woman who has the "glimmerings of a sense of humour." Her life has been colourless and without joy until the arrival of Anne. She tries to instill discipline in the child but grows to love Anne's vivacity and joy.
 Matthew Cuthbert: Marilla's brother, a shy, kind man who takes a liking to Anne from the start. The two become fast friends and he is the first person to ever show Anne unconditional love. Although Marilla has primary responsibility for rearing Anne, Matthew has no qualms about "spoiling" her and indulging her with pretty clothes and fancy shoes.

Anne's friends/classmates 
 Diana Barry: Anne's bosom friend and a kindred spirit. Anne and Diana become best friends from the moment they meet. She is the only girl of Anne's age who lives close to Green Gables. Anne admires Diana for being pretty with black hair and flawless complexion and for her amiable disposition. Diana lacks Anne's vivid imagination but is a loyal friend.
 Gilbert Blythe: A handsome, smart, and witty classmate, two years older than Anne, who has a crush on her. Unaware of Anne's sensitivity about her red hair, he tries to get her attention by holding her braid and calling her "Carrots" in the classroom, and she breaks a slate over his head. Despite his attempts at an apology, Anne's anger and stubbornness prevent her from speaking to him for several years. By the end of the book, however, they reconcile and become good friends.
 Ruby Gillis: Another of Anne's friends. Having several "grown-up" sisters, Ruby loves to share her knowledge of beaux with her friends. Ruby is beautiful, with long golden hair.
 Jane Andrews: One of Anne's friends from school, she is plain and sensible. She does well enough academically to join Anne's class at Queen's.
 Josie Pye: A classmate generally disliked by the other girls (as are her siblings), Josie is vain, dishonest, and jealous of Anne's popularity.
 Prissy Andrews: Another school companion of Anne's, who is assumed to be in a relationship with the teacher, Mr. Phillips.

Avonlea's locals 
 Mrs. Rachel Lynde: A neighbour of Matthew and Marilla, Mrs. Lynde is a noted busybody, but is also industrious and charitable. Although she and Anne start off on the wrong foot due to Mrs. Lynde's blunt criticism and Anne's short temper, they soon become quite close. Mrs. Lynde is married to Thomas Lynde, who is mentioned several times but never appears, and has raised ten children.
 Mr. Phillips: Anne's first teacher at Avonlea, Mr. Phillips is unpopular with students. In Anne's case, he continually misspells her name (without the "E") and punishes only her among twelve pupils who arrive late, resulting in Anne's refusal to attend school for several weeks. Once, he punished Anne for losing her temper with Gilbert Blythe. He is described as lacking discipline, and "courts" one of his older pupils, Prissy Andrews, openly.
 Miss Muriel Stacy: Anne's energetic replacement teacher. Her warm and sympathetic nature appeals to her students, but some of Avonlea's more old-fashioned parents disapprove of her teaching methods. Miss Stacy is another "kindred spirit," whom Anne views as a mentor. Miss Stacy encourages Anne to develop her character and intellect and helps prepare her for the entrance exam at Queen's Academy.
 Mr. and Mrs. Allan: The minister and his wife also befriend Anne, with Mrs. Allan becoming particularly close. She is described as pretty and is a "kindred spirit."
 Mr. & Mrs. Barry: Diana's parents. Mr. Barry is unseen.  He is a farmer. Near the end of the book, he offers to rent some tracts to help out Anne and Marilla, after Matthew's death. Mrs. Barry is a strict parent. After Anne accidentally gets Diana drunk, Mrs. Barry forbids Diana to have anything to do with Anne. This sanction is repealed after Anne saves Diana's younger sister, Minnie May.
 Minnie May Barry: Diana's baby sister, whose life is saved by Anne when she becomes infected with croup.

Others 
 Miss Josephine Barry: Diana's wealthy great-aunt from Charlottetown. She is initially severe, but is quickly charmed and entertained by Anne's imagination, and  invites her and Diana to tea. She refers to Anne as "the Anne-girl" and even sends Anne beaded slippers as a Christmas present.
 Mrs. Hammond: Anne lives with her for a portion of her pre-Green-Gables life and cares for Mrs. Hammond's three sets of twins. Anne is sent to the Hopetown orphan asylum when Mrs. Hammond is forced to break up her home after her husband's sudden death.

Publication history
Anne of Green Gables was first published by L.C. Page & Co. of Boston on June 13, 1908. The book quickly became a best seller. Over 19,000 copies were sold in the first five months. Since then, over 50 million copies have been sold worldwide. A full scan of the first edition, first impression is provided by the L. M. Montgomery Institute.

Montgomery's original manuscript is preserved by the Confederation Centre of the Arts, in Charlottetown, Prince Edward Island.
The centre has announced a project to publish images of the manuscript online in 2022. A transcript of the manuscript was published by Nimbus Publishing in 2019.

Montgomery's original typescript and the corrected proofs are lost.

The first edition has errors in the text.
Critical editions will identify corrections that have been applied to the text by the editor.
The choice of corrections depends on the editor, and will vary between editions.
As an example, the Penguin Classics edition, edited by Benjamin Lefebvre, lists the following corrections:

Related works 
Based on the popularity of her first book, Montgomery wrote a series of sequels to continue the story of her heroine Anne Shirley.

The prequel, Before Green Gables (2008), was written by Budge Wilson with authorization of heirs of L. M. Montgomery.

Tourism and merchandising 

The Green Gables farmhouse is located in Cavendish, Prince Edward Island. Many tourist attractions on Prince Edward Island have been developed based on the fictional Anne, and provincial licence plates once bore her image. Balsam Hollow, the forest that inspired the Haunted Woods and Campbell Pond, the body of water which inspired The Lake of Shining Waters, both described in the book, are located in the vicinity. In addition, the Confederation Centre of the Arts has featured the wildly successful Anne of Green Gables musical on its mainstage every summer for over five decades. The Anne of Green Gables Museum is located in Park Corner, PEI, in a home that inspired L.M. Montgomery.

The province and tourist facilities have highlighted the local connections to the internationally popular novels. Anne of Green Gables has been translated into 36 languages.
"Tourism by Anne fans is an important part of the Island economy". Merchants offer items based on the novels.

The novel has been very popular in Japan, where it is known as Red-haired Anne, and where it has been included in the national school curriculum since 1952. 'Anne' is revered as "an icon" in Japan, especially since 1979 when this story was broadcast as anime, Anne of Green Gables. Japanese couples travel to Prince Edward Island to have civil wedding ceremonies on the grounds of the Green Gables farm. Some Japanese girls arrive as tourists with red-dyed hair styled in pigtails, to look like Anne. In 2014, the Asadora 'Hanako to Anne', which was about Hanako Muraoka, the first person to translate Anne into Japanese, was broadcast and Anne became popular among old and young alike.

A replica of the Green Gables house in Cavendish is located in the theme park Canadian World in Ashibetsu, Hokkaido, Japan. The park was a less expensive alternative for Japanese tourists instead of traveling to P.E.I. The park hosted performances featuring actresses playing Anne and Diana. The theme park is open during the summer season with free admission, though there are no longer staff or interpreters.

The Avonlea theme park near Cavendish and the Cavendish Figurines shop have trappings so that tourists may dress like the book's characters for photos. Souvenir shops throughout Prince Edward Island offer numerous foods and products based on details of the 'Anne Shirley' novels. Straw hats for girls with sewn-in red braids are common, as are bottles of raspberry cordial soda.

Legacy and honours 
Buildings
 The popularity of the books and subsequent film adaptations is credited with inspiring the design and naming of buildings "Green Gables". An example still standing is an apartment block called "Green Gables" built in the 1930s, in New Farm, Queensland, Australia.
Museum
 Bala's Museum, located in Bala, Ontario, Canada, is a house museum established in 1992 and dedicated to Lucy M. Montgomery information and heritage. The house was a tourist home owned by Fanny Pike when Montgomery and her family stayed there on a summer vacation in 1922. That visit to the region inspired the novel The Blue Castle (1926). The town is named Deerwood in the novel; this was Montgomery's only narrative setting outside Atlantic Canada.
Postage stamps
 On May 15, 1975, Canada Post issued Lucy Maud Montgomery, Anne of Green Gables designed by Peter Swan and typographed by Bernard N.J. Reilander. The 8¢ stamps are perforated 13 and were printed by Ashton-Potter Limited.
 In 2008, Canada Post issued two postage stamps and a souvenir sheet honouring Anne and the "Green Gables" house.
Reading lists
 In 2003, Anne of Green Gables was ranked number 41 in The Big Read, a BBC survey of the British public to determine the "nation's best-loved novel" (not children's novel).
 In 2012, it was ranked number nine among all-time children's novels in a survey published by School Library Journal, a monthly with primarily U.S. audience.

Adaptations

Films (theatrical)
The first filmed appearance of Anne Shirley was in the 1919 silent film, Anne of Green Gables, in which the role was played by Mary Miles Minter. The film was directed by William Desmond Taylor. As of 2011, no prints of this silent film adaptation are known to survive. The 1919 film version moved the story from Prince Edward Island to New England, which one American critic—unaware that the novel was set in Canada—praised for "the genuine New England atmosphere called for by the story". Montgomery herself was infuriated with the film for changing Anne from a Canadian to an American, writing in her diary:

It was a pretty little play well photographed, but I think if I hadn't already known it was from my book, that I would never had recognized it. The landscape and folks were 'New England', never P.E Island...A skunk and an American flag were introduced-both equally unknown in PE Island. I could have shrieked with rage over the latter. Such crass, blatant Yankeeism!.

Montgomery disapproved of Minter's performance, writing she had portrayed "a sweet, sugary heroine utterly unlike my gingerly Anne", and complained about a scene where Shirley waved about a shotgun as something as her Anne would never do.

In the 1934 adaption of the novel, Anne was portrayed by Dawn O'Day, who legally changed her name to "Anne Shirley." She reprised the role in Anne of Windy Poplars, a 1940 film adaption. Montgomery liked the 1934 film more than the 1919 film, not least because now the book's dialogue could be portrayed on the silver screen and that two scenes were filmed on location in Prince Edward Island (though the rest of the film was shot in California), but still charged that neither the 1919 nor 1934 versions of Anne of Green Gables quite got her book right. Writing about the 1934 version of Anne of Green Gables, Montgomery wrote in her diary that it was a "thousand times" better than the 1919 version, but still it: "was so entirely different from my vision of the scenes and the people that it did not seem like my book at all". The British scholar Faye Hammill wrote that 1934 film version stripped Anne of the "Canadian and feminist" aspects that the Anne of the books possessed, stating that there was something about Anne that Hollywood cannot get right. Hammill observed that the idea that Anne was entirely cheerful is a product of the film and television versions as the Anne of the books has to deal with loss, rejection, cruel authority figures, and loneliness.

List
 Anne of Green Gables (1919), a silent film adapted to the screen by Frances Marion, directed by William Desmond Taylor, and starring Mary Miles Minter as Anne; this is considered a lost film.
 Anne of Green Gables (1934), directed by George Nichols Jr. and starring Dawn O'Day as Anne Shirley; after filming, O'Day changed her screen name to Anne Shirley.
 Anne of Windy Poplars (1940), directed by Jack Hively, is a black & white "talkie" starring Dawn O'Day as Anne Shirley, now billed as "Anne Shirley".
Akage no An: Green Gables e no Michi (1989, released in 2010) Red-haired Anne: Road to Green Gables - anime, directed by Isao Takahata. A 100-minute theatrical movie compilation of the first six episodes of the animated television series Akage no An, edited together by Takahata in 1989. The film went unreleased until July 17, 2010, when it was screened at the Ghibli Museum.

Literature 
 Ana of California: A Novel (2015), by Andi Teran, is a "contemporary spin on Anne of Green Gables. The lead character of Anne Shirley has been adapted to Ana Cortez, a 15-year-old orphan who "can't tell a tomato plant from a blackberry bush" when she leaves East Los Angeles for the Northern California farm of Emmett and Abbie Garber.

Radio productions 
 Anne of Green Gables (1941), a British radio drama produced and broadcast by BBC Home Service Basic, adapted into four parts by Muriel Levy, and starring Cherry Cottrell as Anne.
 Anne of Green Gables (1944), a recreation of the 1941 BBC Radio drama, produced and broadcast by BBC Home Service Basic.
 Anne of Green Gables (1954), a Canadian radio drama produced and broadcast by CBC Radio, adapted into 13 parts by Andrew Allen and starring Toby Tarnow as Anne.
 Anna zo Zeleného domu (1966), a Slovak radio drama produced and broadcast by Czechoslovak Radio, starring Anna Bučinská as Anne.
 Anne of Green Gables (1971), a British radio drama produced and broadcast by BBC Radio 4, adapted into 13 parts by Cristina Sellors, and read by Ann Murray.
 Anne of Green Gables (1997), a British radio drama produced and broadcast by BBC Radio 4, dramatized into five parts by Marcy Kahan and starred Barbara Barnes as Anne.

Stage productions 
 Anne of Green Gables: The Musical, performed annually in the summer, at Charlottetown Festival, since 1965, this is Canada's longest-running main stage musical production, and has had a total audience of more than 2 million. Anne of Green Gables – The Musical was composed by Canadians Don Harron and Norman Campbell, with lyrics by Elaine Campbell and Mavor Moore. The production has been performed before Queen Elizabeth II and it has toured across Canada, the United States, Europe, and Japan. In 1969, it had a run in London's West End. The Charlottetown Festival production performed at the 1970 World's Fair in Osaka, Japan. Walter Learning directed and organized a successful national tour of the musical in Japan in 1991.
 The Guild in Charlottetown, Prince Edward Island, hosts Anne and Gilbert, The Musical. Written by Nancy White, Bob Johnston, and Jeff Hochhauser, the production is based on Montgomery's sequels featuring Anne Shirley.
 The Nine Lives of L.M. Montgomery, a musical adapted from Montgomery's novel and her life, opened at Kings Playhouse in Georgetown, Prince Edward Island on June 20, 2008, the 100th anniversary of the book's publication. With book and lyrics by Adam-Michael James and music by Emmy-nominated composer Leo Marchildon, the musical depicts events from Montgomery's life and features as characters heroines from all of her novels. Anne figures prominently, and is shown from age 12 into her 40s. Gilbert Blythe also appears. The show's second production was at the Carrefour Theatre in Charlottetown, Prince Edward Island and opened July 11, 2009. Both years, the musical was nominated for The Prince Edward Island Museum and Heritage Foundation's Wendell Boyle Award. In July 2010, a concert version of the show toured Prince Edward Island, with four performances at Green Gables.
 Theatreworks USA, a New York-based children's theatre company, produced an Anne of Green Gables musical in 2006 at the Lucille Lortel Theatre. A revived production, with musical contributions from Gretchen Cryer, is planned to tour grade-schools.
 The Peterborough Players, based in Peterborough, New Hampshire, staged an adaptation by Joseph Robinette of Anne of Green Gables in August 2009.
 Anne and Gilbert is a musical adaptation of the books Anne of Avonlea and Anne of the Island. It depicts the relationship of Anne and Gilbert during their years as teachers and college students, as well as their return to Avonlea.
 Anne of Green Gables, adapted by Julia Britton and Robert Chuter performed as a site-specific production at Rippon Lea, Melbourne, Australia December - February, 1996–97.
Bend in the Road is a musical adaptation of Anne of Green Gables featured in the 2013 New York Musical Theatre Festival.  The musical is written by Benita Scheckel and Michael Upward.
A "folk-rock" adaptation entitled Anne of Green Gables by Matte O'Brien and Matt Vinson was premiered at the 2018 Finger Lakes Musical Theatre Festival, with a subsequent 2020 concept album and a 2022 production at Goodspeed Opera House.

Television films and episodic series (animated) 

 Akage no An (1979; Red-Haired Anne), an animated television series, part of Nippon Animation's World Masterpiece Theater, produced in Japan and directed by Isao Takahata.
 Anne of Green Gables: The Animated Series (2001), a PBS Kids animated series for older children ages eight to twelve, created by Sullivan Entertainment Inc.
 Anne: Journey to Green Gables (2005), an animated video film produced by Sullivan Entertainment and the prequel to Anne of Green Gables: The Animated Series (2001–2002)
 Kon'nichiwa Anne: Before Green Gables (2009), part of the World Masterpiece Theater, this prequel to Akage no An is based on Budge Wilson's authorized prequel Before Green Gables (2008).

Television films and episodic series (live action) 
 Anne of Green Gables (1952), a BBC television series starring Carole Lorimer as Anne. Broadcast live, no recordings are thought to have ever existed, as it was made before telerecording was practised by the BBC.
 Anne of Green Gables (1956), a made-for-television musical version directed by Norman Campbell and starring Toby Tarnow as Anne.
 Anne de Green Gables (1957), a French-Canadian television film directed by Jacques Gauthier, starring Mireille Lachance as Anne Shirley.
 Anne of Green Gables (1958), a recreation of the 1956 film directed by Don Harron, starring Kathy Willard as Anne.
 Anne of Green Gables (1972), a British made-for-television 5-part mini-series directed by Joan Craft, starring Kim Braden as Anne.
 Anne of Avonlea  (1975), a British made-for-television 4-part mini-series sequel directed by Joan Craft, starring Kim Braden as Anne.
Anne of Green Gables (1985), a CBC four-hour television mini series directed by Kevin Sullivan with Megan Follows as Anne; widely considered the definitive version to date.
 Anne of Green Gables: The Sequel (1987), a sequel to the 1985 miniseries which aired on CBC and the Disney Channel as Anne of Avonlea: The Continuing Story of Anne of Green Gables.
 Road to Avonlea (1990–1996) shown on CBC, a live-action television spin-off series based upon characters and episodes from several of L.M. Montgomery's other books. Anne herself never appears but other characters from the previous two films are included, and the series is set within the same continuity as Sullivan's 1980s miniseries.
 Anne of Green Gables: The Continuing Story (2000), a sequel to the 1985 television miniseries not based on the novels.
 Anne of Green Gables: A New Beginning (2008), a prequel to the 1985 television miniseries not based on the novels.
 L.M. Montgomery's Anne of Green Gables (2016), a 90-minute made-for-television adaptation of the book by Breakthrough Films & Television, adapted by Susan Coyne, directed by John Kent Harrison, and stars Ella Ballentine as Anne, Sara Botsford as Marilla Cuthbert, and Martin Sheen as Matthew Cuthbert. It was followed by Anne of Green Gables:  The Good Stars and Anne of Green Gables: Fire & Dew (both in 2017).
 Anne with an E (2017–2019), a Canadian joint CBC-Netflix  episodic drama  that developed the subtext of trauma in the novel through original storylines. It was adapted by Moira Walley-Beckett, and stars Amybeth McNulty as Anne Shirley, Geraldine James as Marilla Cuthbert,  R. H. Thomson as Matthew Cuthbert, and Lucas Jade Zumann as Gilbert Blythe.

Web productions 
 Green Gables Fables (2014–2016), an American-Canadian web series which conveys the story in the form of Tumblr posts, tweets, vlogs, and other social media. It is a modern adaptation of Anne of Green Gables and Anne of the Island, with many of its elements changed to better suit 21st-century culture. Mandy Harmon portrays the main character, Anne Shirley.
 Project Green Gables (2015–2016), a Finnish web series and a modern adaptation of Anne of Green Gables, which conveys the story in the form of vlogs. Laura Eklund Nhaga plays Anne Shirley.

Parodies 
As one of the most familiar characters in Canadian literature, Anne of Green Gables has been parodied by several Canadian comedy troupes, including CODCO (Anne of Green Gut) and The Frantics (Fran of the Fundy).

References

Bibliography 

 
 
  authorized by the heirs of L. M. Montgomery.
 
 
  Critical edition, edited by Wendy E. Barry, Margaret Anne Doody, and Mary E. Doody Jones.
  Critical edition, edited by Cecily Devereux.
  Critical edition, edited by Elizabeth Waterston and Mary Henley Rubio.
  Critical edition, edited by Benjamin Lefebvre.
  Edited by Carolyn Strom Collins.

External links 

 
 
 
 
 
 Scan of the first edition, first impression of Anne of Green Gables, L.M. Montgomery Institute, University of Prince Edward Island
 Anne of Green Gables Centenary
 L. M. Montgomery Institute, University of Prince Edward Island
 "L.M. Montgomery Research Centre", University of Guelph Library Archival & Special Collections.
 

 
1908 Canadian novels
Anne of Green Gables books
New Canadian Library
Novels by Lucy Maud Montgomery
Books about adoption
Novels about orphans
Canadian children's novels
Novels set in Prince Edward Island
Canadian novels adapted into films
1908 children's books
Canadian children's books
Canadian novels adapted into television shows
Canadian novels adapted into plays
Novels about teachers
1908 debut novels
Culture of Prince Edward Island